Awera is a Lakes Plain language of Papua, Indonesia. It is spoken on the east side of Geelvink Bay, in the single village of Awera in Wapoga District, Waropen Regency, Papua. The village has a majority of Ansus (Austronesian) speakers.

References

Wapoga languages
Languages of western New Guinea